The 2014–15 Penn Quakers women's basketball team represents the University of Pennsylvania during the 2014–15 NCAA Division I women's basketball season. The Quakers, led by sixth year head coach Mike McLaughlin, play their home games at the Palestra and are members of the Ivy League.

Roster

Schedule

|-
!colspan=8 style="background:#95001A; color:#01256E;"| Regular season

|-
!colspan=8 style="background:#95001A; color:#01256E;" | 2015 WNIT

Source:

See also
 2014–15 Penn Quakers men's basketball team

References

Penn
Penn Quakers women's basketball seasons
Penn Quakers
Penn Quakers